The Old Gulf County Courthouse is a historic redbrick courthouse building located at 222 North 2nd Street in  Wewahitchka, Florida. It was built in 1927 in the Classical Revival style after Wewahitchka was designated the county seat of newly created Gulf County. In 1965 the county seat was moved to Port St. Joe and a new courthouse was built there. The old courthouse still functions as an auxiliary to the Port St. Joe courthouse.

In 1989, the Old Gulf County Courthouse was listed in A Guide to Florida's Historic Architecture, published by the University of Florida Press.

References

External links
 Florida's Historic Courthouses

Buildings and structures in Gulf County, Florida
Gulf
Government buildings completed in 1927
1927 establishments in Florida